The 2016 World Junior Wrestling Championships were the 40th edition of the World Junior Wrestling Championships and were held in Mâcon, France between 30 August and 4 September 2016.

Medal table

Team ranking

Medal summary

Men's freestyle

Men's Greco-Roman

Women's freestyle

References

World Junior Championships
Wrestling Championships
International wrestling competitions hosted by France
Sport in France
Wrestling in France
World Junior Wrestling Championships